Hapalioloemus is a genus of flies in the family Tachinidae.

Species
H. macheralis Baranov, 1934

References

Diptera of Asia
Exoristinae
Tachinidae genera